Charles Delmer Coyle (September 16, 1887  – January 19, 1954) was a Canadian Member of Parliament for the federal riding of Elgin from 1945 to 1954. Born in Kinglake, Ontario, Coyle was a member of the Progressive Conservative Party of Canada. Prior to his election to Parliament, Coyle was a tobacco farmer, councillor for Straffordville (1925-1928), deputy reeve (1929-1930) and reeve of Bayham Township (1931–33 and 1943–1945).

References

1887 births
1954 deaths
Members of the House of Commons of Canada from Ontario
Progressive Conservative Party of Canada MPs